Germantown is the name of three places in the State of Tennessee in the United States of America:

 Germantown, Cheatham County, Tennessee
 Germantown, Davidson County, Tennessee
 Germantown, Shelby County, Tennessee

See also  
 Germantown (disambiguation)